Nydia may refer to:

Alba Nydia Díaz (born 1955), Puerto Rican actress
Carmen Nydia Velázquez, Puerto Ricoan comedian and singer
Irma Nydia Vázquez (1929–2019), Miss Puerto Rico 1948
Nydia Caro (born 1948), American and Puerto Rican actress and singer
Nydia Blas (born 1981), American photographer
Nydia Ecury (1926–2012), Aruban-Dutch writer, translator and actress
Nydia Lamarque (1906–1982), Argentine poet
Nydia Pereyra-Lizaso (1920–1998), Uruguayan composer, pianist, and music educator
Nydia Quintero Turbay (born 1932), first lady of Colombia
Nydia Rojas (born 1980), American singer
Nydia Velázquez (born 1953), Puerto Rican American politician in the United States House of Representatives since 1993
Nydia Westman (1902–1970), American actress and singer